ZynAddSubFX (also now called Zyn-Fusion) is a free and open-source software synthesizer for Linux, Mac OS X and Microsoft Windows. As of version 3, the completely new user interface is being released under proprietary terms with an open-source-eventually intention while the synthesis engine remains under the original GPL terms.

For sound generation it has three hybrid synth engines that combine additive, subtractive, Fourier and other synthesis methods. No external samples are used to produce the sound; everything is done by synthesis.
The synthesizer has effects like reverberation, echo, chorus, distortion, equalization and others, and supports microtonal tunings.

The original author of ZynAddSubFX is Romanian programmer Nasca Octavian Paul. The project was started in March 2002 and the first public version (1.0.0) was released on September 25, 2002. Since 2009, the new maintainer is Mark McCurry.

Sound generation
ZynAddSubFX combines several different methods of audio synthesis in order to create sounds: additive synthesis by the ADSynth engine, subtractive synthesis by the SUBSynth engine, and an original algorithm used to generate wavetables in the PADSynth engine.

Music made with ZynAddSubFX
ZynAddSubFX was featured in the KVR One-Synth-Challenge contest.

In November 2013, unfa released an album that was entirely made with ZynAddSubFX.
Slavonic pagan ambient project Svitlo albums were created using ZynAddSubFX as synthesizer.

See also

Yoshimi (synthesizer), Linux only, based on ZynAddSubFX 2.4.0
Free audio software
Linux audio software

References

External links
ZynAddSubFX home page

Free audio software
Open source software synthesizers
Free software programmed in C++
Software synthesizers for Linux
Software that uses FLTK
2002 software
Computer-related introductions in 2002